The following is a list of Teen Choice Award winners and nominees for Choice Breakout Artist. The award is sometimes divided into Choice Male Breakout Artist, Choice Female Breakout Artist and Choice Breakout Group.

Winners and nominees

1999

2000s

2010s

References

Breakout Artist
Music awards for breakthrough artist